Isaac Fletcher (November 22, 1784 – October 19, 1842) was an American lawyer and politician. He served as a U.S. Representative from Vermont and as Adjutant General of the Vermont Militia.

Biography
Fletcher was born in Dunstable, Massachusetts to Joseph Fletcher and Molly Cummings Fletcher. He pursued classical studies, and graduated with honors from Dartmouth College in Hanover, New Hampshire in 1808. He taught at the academy at Chesterfield, New Hampshire while in college, and after graduating he studied law with the firm of Prescott & Dunbar in Keene, New Hampshire.  He was admitted to the bar in Keene and in Newfane, Vermont in December 1811, and moved to Lyndon, Vermont to start a practice.  Among the prospective attorneys who studied under Fletcher were Thomas J. D. Fuller and Thomas Bartlett Jr.

He was a member of the Vermont House of Representatives for several terms between 1819 and 1825, and served as Speaker from 1824 to 1825. Fletcher was Caledonia County State's Attorney from 1820 until 1828, and a member of the state constitutional convention in 1822.  Fletcher received a master's degree from the University of Vermont in 1823.

He was military aide to Governor Richard Skinner, and served as Adjutant General of the State Militia from 1824 until 1833.

He was elected as a Democrat to the Twenty-fifth and Twenty-sixth Congresses, serving from March 4, 1837 until March 3, 1841. While in Congress, he was the Chairman of the Committee on Patents. He was an unsuccessful candidate for reelection in 1840 to the Twenty-seventh Congress.

Personal life
Fletcher married Abigail Stone on February 4, 1812. They had one son, Charles B. Fletcher.

Death
Fletcher's health declined rapidly during his final term in Congress, which was attributed by doctors to overwork. He died in Lyndon on October 19, 1842 and is interred at the Lyndon Town Cemetery in Lyndon.

References

Further reading
 "A history of the town of Dunstable, Massachusetts, from its earliest settlement to the year of Our Lord 1873" by Elias Nason and George Bailey Loring, published by A. Mudge, 1877.

External links
 
 Govtrack.us
 The Political Graveyard
 

1784 births
1842 deaths
Dartmouth College alumni
University of Vermont alumni
Democratic Party members of the Vermont House of Representatives
Speakers of the Vermont House of Representatives
People from Dunstable, Massachusetts
People from Caledonia County, Vermont
Vermont lawyers
American militia generals
Burials in Vermont
Democratic Party members of the United States House of Representatives from Vermont
19th-century American politicians
State's attorneys in Vermont
19th-century American lawyers
Military personnel from Massachusetts